Mads Christensen (10 May 1856 – 28 December 1929) was a New Zealand Lutheran pastor. He was born in Egvad, Denmark, on 10 May 1856.

References

1856 births
1929 deaths
19th-century Lutheran clergy
New Zealand Protestant ministers and clergy
Danish emigrants to New Zealand
People from Aabenraa Municipality
20th-century Lutheran clergy